Hazelwood House is a B listed building in Glasgow. It was designed in the manner of the Arts and Crafts movement. Built in 1882, it is located in the suburb of Dumbreck adjacent to Bellahouston Park, and was one of the first buildings in Glasgow to enjoy a domestic electricity supply.  {
  "type": "FeatureCollection",
  "features": [
    {
      "type": "Feature",
      "properties": {},
      "geometry": {
        "type": "Point",
        "coordinates": [
          -4.2820715904236,
          55.849035769622
        ]
      }
    },
    {
      "type": "Feature",
      "properties": {},
      "geometry": {
        "type": "Point",
        "coordinates": [
          -4.311565160751344,
          55.844060532638395
        ]
      }
    }
  ]
}

History 
Hazelwood House first appears on maps in 1890.

The house was designed by James Milne Monro. It was later improved by Robert Cumming in 1913.

It is known as the main building in the four street area known as "Glasgow's Electric Suburb" because the houses were the first in Glasgow to be built with internal electrical wiring – including electric lights and electric cookers.

In the late 20th century it was used as a nursing home, before it was purchased in 2003 for religious activities and retreats.

Hazelwood House is within the Hazelwood Conservation Area, created on 8 March 2002.

The house serves as a religious retreat and conference centre. It hosts annual public events such as Christmas carol concerts and family days.

Architecture and features 
Its notable architectural features include symmetrical front bay windows, a Tudor arch over the front door and a slate roof.

A lodge is adjacent.

Substantial private gardens host a brick-walled, earthenware coping and mature trees.

Access 
The public can access the house on walking tours that take place during Doors Open Days each September.

References 

Arts and Crafts movement
Category B listed buildings in Glasgow
Conservation and restoration of cultural heritage
Pollokshields
Houses in Glasgow